John Doyle (born 1957) is a Canadian writer who is a television critic at The Globe and Mail.

Early life 
John Doyle was born in 1957 in Nenagh, County Tipperary, Ireland, and came to Canada in 1980.

Career 
Doyle was first hired by The Globe and Mail to write for Broadcast Week, the paper's weekly television listings, as a columnist. In 2000, he was appointed the newspaper's daily television critic. Doyle also covers soccer for the paper. His writing on soccer has appeared in The New York Times, The Guardian, the ECW Press anthology Best Canadian Sports Writing, and the soccer magazine Eight by Eight.

In 2005, Doyle published his first book, the memoir A Great Feast of Light: Growing Up Irish in the Television Age about his early life in deeply conservative rural Ireland, and the book The World is a Ball: The Joy, Madness, and Meaning of Soccer. Doyle has covered multiple FIFA World Cup, Euro tournaments, and the FIFA Women's World Cup.

In 2004 he was involved in a public disagreement with Bill O'Reilly, then of Fox News. O'Reilly complained about Doyle's writing on his TV show. An article he published in 2010 argued that the Giller Prize and Gemini Awards were elitist. In a 2017 review of The Great Canadian Baking Show, Doyle called Dan Levy "fey". Levy, and a CBC critic, argued that Doyle's use of the term was homophobic.

Bibliography

See also
 List of newspaper columnists

References

External links
 Author page at Random House of Canada
 Audio interview re: A Great Feast of Light: June 2007
 Columns at The Globe and Mail

1957 births
Canadian television critics
Irish emigrants to Canada
People from Nenagh
Living people
The Globe and Mail columnists
Canadian memoirists